Lia is a Brazilian miniseries produced by RecordTV and Casablanca. The series is created by Paula Richard. It premiered on 26 June 2018 and ended on 9 July 2018. Bruna Pazinato stars as the titular character. The series also has the participation of Graziella Schmitt, Felipe Cardoso, Augusto Garcia, Leandro Lima, Brenno Leone, Júlia Maggessi, and Suzana Alves.

The production of miniseries began in May 2018.

Plot 
Lia is a strong and good-hearted young woman who has never stopped believing in love despite the mishaps in her life. After losing her mother as a child and going through various mistreatment in the hands of her stepmother Laila, she falls in love with Jacó, but he only has eyes for her cunning sister, Raquel, a girl who likes to seduce the boys and covets riches, though she decides to accept his advances to make Lia suffer. Jacó made a deal with the young women's father, Labão, to work seven years in exchange for Raquel's hand, but on the wedding day, Lia is covered with a veil and is given in marriage by her father. After discovering the exchange the next day, Jacó questions Labão, who states that the family tradition is that the eldest daughter marry first, but that he could also marry Raquel in return for another seven years of work, which the boy accepts, obsessed with her sensuality.

Married to the same man, the sisters vie for the attention of Jacó, who attends to Raquel's luxurious desires, while humiliating Lia, and having to deal with Jacó's involvement with the two servants of the house, Zilpa and Bila. In spite of all contempt, Lia gives Jacó seven children: Rubem, Simeão, Levi, Judá, Issacar, Zebulom, and Diná, the only daughter in the house and the only child to receive affection from her father, which causes envy of the other brothers.  Meanwhile Raquel manages to have only José, whom his father has as the only one worthy of true love, which causes rebellion in the children of Lia. Determined not to let her family collapse and prove her true love, Lia can gradually show Jacó that kindness can heal scars and that she is the right woman for him.

Cast 
 Bruna Pazinato as Lia Paddan
 Laura Svacina as Young Lia
 Graziella Schmitt as Raquel Paddan
 Sofia Budke as Young Raquel
 Felipe Cardoso as Jacó de Israel
 Augusto Garcia as Saul
 Leandro Lima as Rubem de Israel Paddan
 Brenno Leone as Simeão de Israel Paddan
 Júlia Maggessi as Diná de Israel Paddan
 Suzana Alves as Laila
 Théo Becker as Labão Paddan
 Saulo Meneghetti as Hananias
 Thaís Müller as Zilpa Mayan
 Isabella Tigre as Young Zilpa
 Caca Ottoni as Bila Mut
 Felipe Cunha as Eliabe
 Bruno Peixoto	as José de Israel Paddan
 Maurício Pitanga as Levi de Israel Paddan
 Bru Malucelli as Judá de Israel Paddan
 Marcus Bessa as Issacar de Israel Paddan
 Igor Fernandez as Zebulom de Israel Paddan
 Matheus Venâncio as Aser Mayan
 Walter Nunes as Gade Mayan
 Caio Lucas Leão as Naftali Mut
 Rafael Awi as Dã Mut
 Paula Jubé as Adinah
 Mariana Cysne as Dalila
 Pedro Monteiro as Esaú
 Silvio Matos as Isaque
 Rose Abdallah as Rebeca
 Paulo Carvalho as Rei Hamor
 Bruno Ahmed as Príncipe Siquém
 Nica Bonfim as Parteira

Ratings

References 

RecordTV miniseries
Portuguese-language telenovelas
Television series based on the Bible
2018 Brazilian television series debuts
2018 Brazilian television series endings
Brazilian television miniseries
Period television series